Shirley Nathan-Pulliam (born May 20, 1939) is a former American politician from Maryland and a member of the Democratic Party. Nathan-Pulliam resigned in 2019 due to poor health.

Background
Nathan-Pulliam was born in Trelawny, Jamaica on May 20, 1939. She studied nursing at a number of schools before receiving her bachelor's degree in nursing from the University of Maryland at Baltimore in 1980 and a master's degree in administrative science from the Johns Hopkins University in 1984. In addition to owning her own business, she has been a faculty associate in nursing for Johns Hopkins. Before being elected in 1994, Nathan-Pulliam was active with Democratic Party organizations at the state and national level, as well as with Planned Parenthood of Maryland and various professional nursing organizations. Nathan-Pulliam has received a number of awards for her advocacy on health care.

In the Legislature
Senator Nathan-Pulliam is currently serving in her first term in the Maryland State Senate, representing Maryland's 44th Legislative District located in parts of Baltimore County and Baltimore City. Nathan-Pulliam is a member of the Education Health and Environmental Affairs Committee.  She previously served 20 years in the Maryland House of Delegates, serving as a Deputy Majority Whip and as a member of the Health and Government Operations Committee. She remains an active member of both the Legislative Black Caucus of Maryland and of Women Legislators of Maryland.

Legislative notes
 voted for income tax reduction in 1998 (SB750)
 voted in favor of increasing the sales tax whilst simultaneously reducing income tax rates for some income brackets - Tax Reform Act of 2007(HB2)
 voted in favor of in-state tuition for individuals who are not permanent residents, under certain conditions - Higher Education -Tuition Charges -Maryland High School Students, 2007 (HB6)

Election results

1994 General election results District 10
Voters to choose three:
{| class="wikitable"
|-
! Name !! Votes !! Percent !! Outcome
|-
| Clifford H. Andrews || 4,039 || 6% || Lost
|-
| Emmett C. Burns Jr. || 17,637 || 27% || Won
|-
| Shirley Nathan-Pulliam || 17,411 || 26% || Won
|-
| Beverly E. Goldstein || 5,535 || 8% || Lost
|-
| Clifton McDonald || 4,321 || 7% || Lost
|-
| Joan N. Parker || 16,919 || 26% || Won
|}

1998 General election results District 10
Voters to choose three:
{| class="wikitable"
|-
! Name !! Votes !! Percent !! Outcome
|-
| Emmett C. Burns Jr. || 23,203 || 36% || Won
|-
| Adrienne Jones || 20,676 || 32% || Won
|-
| Shirley Nathan-Pulliam || 21,348 || 33% || Won
|}

2002 General election results District 10
Voters to choose three:
{| class="wikitable"
|-
! Name !! Votes !! Percent !! Outcome
|-
| Emmett C. Burns Jr. || 27,921 || 31.52% || Won
|-
| Adrienne Jones || 25,655 || 28.96% || Won
|-
| Shirley Nathan-Pulliam || 26,269 || 29.66% || Won
|}

2006 General election results District 10
Voters to choose three:
{| class="wikitable"
|-
!Name
!Votes
!Percent
!Outcome
|-
|Emmett C. Burns, Jr.
|29,140
|  34.2%
|   Won
|-
|Adrienne A. Jones
|27,064
|  31.8%
|   Won
|-
|Shirley Nathan-Pulliam
|28,544
|  33.5%
|   Won
|-
|Other Write-Ins
|370
|  0.4%
|   
|}

2010 General election results District 10
Voters to choose three:
{| class="wikitable"
|-
! Name !! Votes !! Percent !! Outcome
|-
| Emmett C. Burns Jr. || 31,513 || 31.60% || Won
|-
| Brian C Eybs (Write In) || 16 || 0.00% || Lost
|-
| Adrienne A. Jones || 29,719 || 29.80% || Won
|-
| Shirley Nathan-Pulliam || 31,399 || 31.50% || Won
|-
| Jeanne L. Turnock || 6,837 || 6.90% || Lost
|-
| Michael Tyrone Brown, Sr. (Write In) || 9 || 0.00% || Lost
|-
| Frederick Ware-Newsome (Write In) || 11 || 0.00% || Lost
|-
| Other Write-Ins || 296 || 0.30% || N/A
|}

2014 General election results District 44
Voters to choose one:
{| class="wikitable"
|-
! Name !! Votes !! Percent !! Outcome
|-
| Shirley Nathan-Pulliam || 26,261 || 80.2% || Won
|-
| Bernard Reiter || 6,412 || 19.6% || Lost
|-
| Other Write-Ins || 51 || 0.2% || N/A
|}

2018 General election results District 44
Voters to choose one:
{| class="wikitable"
|-
! Name !! Votes !! Percent !! Outcome
|-
| Victor Clark, Jr. || 6,280 || 15.2% || Lost
|-
| Shirley Nathan-Pulliam || 34,834 ||  84.5% || Won
|-
| Other Write-Ins || 86 || 0.2% || N/A
|}

References

External links

American politicians of Jamaican descent
Democratic Party members of the Maryland House of Delegates
Living people
Women state legislators in Maryland
1939 births
Johns Hopkins University alumni
Jamaican emigrants to the United States
People from Trelawny Parish
21st-century American politicians
21st-century American women politicians
Democratic Party Maryland state senators